Laika was a Soviet space dog who was the first animal to orbit the Earth.

Laika may also refer to:
 Laika (dog breed), a type of Russian hunting dog, and a generic name for several Russian and Scandinavian dog breed, listed in the article

Art and entertainment
Lajka (English title: Laika) a 2017 Czech animated science fiction comedy film 
 Laika (comic), a 2007 graphic novel about the Russian space dog

Music
 Laïko, a Greek music style developed in the 20th century
 Modern laïka, a modern Greek music style consisting of both pop and dance genres
 Laika (band), a UK indie band
 Laika & The Cosmonauts, a Finnish instrumental rock band
 "Neighborhood #2 (Laïka)", a song by Arcade Fire from Funeral 
 "Laika", a 1988 song by Mecano from Descanso Dominical
 "Laika", a 1993 song by Moxy Früvous from Bargainville
 "Laika", a 2009 song by Kill Hannah from Wake Up the Sleepers
 "Laika", a 2013 song by Sticky Fingers from Caress Your Soul
 "Laika", a 2013 song by Wil Wagner from Laika
 "Laika", a 2016 song by Boston Manor (band) from Be Nothing

Business and brands
 Lada Laika, a former Russian car manufactured by Autovaz
 Laika (cigarette), a Soviet brand of cigarettes 1957–1990s
 Laika (company), an American animation studio formerly known as Will Vinton Studios
 Laika-class submarine, a Russian class of nuclear-powered fifth-generation multi-purpose submarines currently under development

Other uses
 Laika (EHR testing framework), an open source Electronic Health Record testing framework
 Laika (island), in the Shepherd Islands, Vanuatu

See also
 Planet Laika, a PlayStation video game about space travel
 Leica (disambiguation)